May Brodbeck (July 26, 1917 – August 1, 1983) was an American philosopher of science.

Biography

Brodbeck was born in Newark, New Jersey. She studied chemistry at New York University, attending evening courses while working, and earned a bachelor's degree in 1941. Thereafter, she worked as a high-school chemistry teacher, before being recruited into the Manhattan Project. Following the war, she studied philosophy at the University of Iowa, completing a Ph.D. supervised by Gustav Bergmann in 1947, on the subject of John Dewey's Logic: The Theory of Inquiry.

Upon finishing her PhD, she was offered a professorship at the University of Minnesota, where she worked from 1947 to 1974, eventually rising to chair of the philosophy department (1967–1970) and dean of the graduate school (1972–1974). She then returned to the University of Iowa as Carver Professor of Philosophy and Dean of the Faculties. In the administrative part of her role at the University of Iowa, among other initiatives she focused in particular on the status of women in the university, and oversaw the creation of one of the first women's studies programs. She stepped down from administration in 1981, retired in 1983, and died later that year in Menlo Park, California.

Work

Brodbeck's career focused on a number of issues in the philosophy of science, in particular aiming to include the social sciences within its remit. She edited two widely read anthologies on the subject: Readings in the Philosophy of Science (1953, co-edited with Herbert Feigl), and Readings in the Philosophy of the Social Sciences (1968). Later in her career, she also wrote on the philosophy of mind, defending a form of psychophysical parallelism.

Select bibliography 

Readings in the Philosophy of Science (1953, co-edited with Herbert Feigl) At Internet Archive.
List of works by May Brodbeck listed at PhilPapers.

References

External links 
 "Brodbeck, May (1917–1983)." Women in World History: A Biographical Encyclopedia, Encyclopedia.com. 26 Jul. 2019
Addis, Laird (2010), "Brodbeck, May Selznick", The Dictionary of Modern American Philosophers (Archived by Wayback Machine)
Portraits of Brodbeck via Iowa Women's Archives, and Minnesota Philosophy Department photo c.1953 featuring her.

1917 births
1983 deaths
American women philosophers
Jewish American academics
Jewish philosophers
Philosophers of science
New York University alumni
University of Iowa alumni
University of Minnesota faculty
University of Iowa faculty
20th-century American philosophers
People from Newark, New Jersey
20th-century American women
20th-century American Jews